KKDJ-LD, VHF digital and virtual channel 8, is a low-powered Sonlife-affiliated television station licensed to Santa Maria, California, United States. The station is owned by Cocola Broadcasting. Station is currently dark pending transition to digital.

Originally, KKDJ was a translator of ABC affiliate KEYT (channel 3) from Santa Barbara serving the Santa Maria Valley from the mid 1950s to the late 1990s.

KKDJ simulcasts the radio shows, offers local news and weather, entertainment programming and serves as an "MTV" digital over-the-air affiliate, playing music videos and re-airing some of the original MTV VJ shows.

External links
 
 

Arroyo Grande, California
KDJ-LD
Television channels and stations established in 1999
1999 establishments in California